Photo editor could refer to:

Raster graphics editor, a computer program that allows users to create and edit images interactively on a computer screen and save them in one of many raster graphics formats
Picture editor, a professional who collects, reviews, and chooses photographs or illustrations for publication in alignment with preset guidelines
a professional engaged in image editing, either digital or photo-chemical photographs, or illustrations

See also
Photo manipulation, altering images using a photo editor
Graphics software, a program or collection of programs that enable a person to create, edit or publish digital imagery